The Kosovo women's national under-20 basketball team is a national basketball team of Kosovo, administered by the Kosovo Basketball Federation.
It represents the country in women's international under-20 basketball competitions.

The team finished 12th at the 2019 FIBA U20 Women's European Championship Division B and 15th at the 2022 FIBA U20 Women's European Championship Division B.

See also
Kosovo women's national under-18 basketball team
Kosovo women's national under-16 basketball team
Kosovo men's national under-20 basketball team

References

External links
Archived records of Kosovo team participations

Basketball in Kosovo
Women's national under-20 basketball teams
U